This is a list of all tornadoes that were confirmed by local offices of the National Weather Service in the United States in May 2010.

United States yearly total

May

Note: 15 tornadoes were confirmed in the final totals, but do not have a listed rating.

May 1 event

May 2 event

May 3 event

May 4 event

May 10 event

May 11 event

May 12 event

May 13 event

May 14 event (Southwest)

May 15 event (Southeast)

May 15 event (Southwest)

May 16 event

May 17 event

May 18 event
Note: includes a few tornadoes in the early hours of May 19 related to the same supercells.

May 19 event (Northwest)

May 19 event (South)

May 20 event

May 21 event

May 22 event

May 23 event

May 24 event

May 25 event

May 26 event

May 27 event

May 31 event

See also
Tornadoes of 2010

Notes

References

 05
2010, 05
Tornadoes